Chloriona is a genus of planthoppers belonging to the family Delphacidae.

The genus was first described by Fieber in 1866.

The species of this genus are found in Eurasia.

Species:
 Chloriona chinai
 Chloriona glaucescens
 Chloriona smaragdula
 Chloriona stenoptera
 Chloriona vasconica

References

Delphacinae
Auchenorrhyncha genera